Rediffusion may refer to

 Rediffusion, a business which distributed radio and television signals through wired relay networks
 A number of companies which derived their names from Rediffusion:
 Rediffusion London, a UK TV broadcaster formerly known as Associated Rediffusion
 Rediffusion Television, a Hong Kong broadcaster
 Rediffusion Simulation, a manufacturer of flight simulators
 Rediffusion S.A., a Swiss cable radio and TV broadcaster merged into UPC Switzerland in 1994